R. Puthunainar Adithan was an Indian politician and former MLA elected to Tamil Nadu legislative assembly in 1991 as an ADMK candidate from Cheranmadevi constituency. His own elder brother is Mr. R. Dhanushkodi Adithan a notable Congress leader from south Tamil Nadu and 5 times Lok Sabha Member.

References 

All India Anna Dravida Munnetra Kazhagam politicians
Living people
Year of birth missing (living people)
Tamil Nadu MLAs 1991–1996
Tamil Nadu politicians